ADAC Laboratories was a Silicon Valley medical device company specialising in nuclear medicine gamma camera manufacturing and associated nuclear medicine processing computers and software. It was originally located at 10300 Bubb Road, Cupertino, California, 95014, then as the company expanded moved in turn to the following locations. 4747 Hellyer Avenue, San Jose, CA 951, then 255 San Geronimo Way, Sunnyvale, CA, then from ~1993, 540 Alder Drive Milpitas, CA 95035. Although most people called the company ADAC or adaclabs, the name ADAC was an acronym of Analytical Development Associates Corporation. It was incorporated in California on October 14, 1970.

In the early years ADAC developed both small nuclear medicine related hardware and software products but between 1975 and the 1980s, become better known for their computer systems such as the CDS and DPS acquisition and processing systems. In 1987-88 ADAC maintained Philips ARC gamma camera installed base under licence and In ~1991 Philips exited the nuclear medicine market. At that time, the Dutch vendor licensed its nuclear technology to both ADAC and Digital Design of France". The 1990s were the dominant decade for ADAC in terms of gamma camera production, manufacturing the Argus, Genesys, Polaris, Thyrus, Transcam, Vertex, Forte and Skylight gamma cameras as well as the EPIC detector and molecular coincidence detection (MCD) option, along with the Pegasys nuclear medicine processing workstation and radiation treatment planning systems (RTP). In 1993 it was sued by Elscint for patent infringement and in 1994 purchased Philips' nuclear medicine patent portfolio, consisting of 13 U.S. patents and 56 foreign patents and patent applications. "ADAC announced it had filed a patent infringement claim against Elscint in U.S. District Court in San Jose, California, charging Elscint with violating the Philips patents. ADAC filed the lawsuit in direct response to the Elscint litigation".  In 1996, ADAC was the recipient of a Malcolm Baldrige National Quality Award and during that year employed 720 people worldwide.

ADAC Laboratories was acquired by Philips in 2000 for $426 million, and incorporated into Philips Medical Systems (later Philips Healthcare). ADAC continued to operate from the Milpitas location until around 2006 and was submitting FDA pre-market filings under the company name ADAC Laboratories, Milpitas, until 2006, where upon the 540 Alder Drive, Milpitas operation was closed and ADAC become fully integrated into the Philips organisation.

Products

Network based Nuclear Medicine Analysis and early products

Nuclear Medicine Acquisition/Processing and Processing Only Workstations

Digital Radiography Systems

Gamma Cameras

Products post Philips acquisition but issuing FDA pre-market filings as ADAC Laboratories, 540 Alder Dr., Milpitas, CA 95035.

Positron Emission Tomography (PET)

Radiation Treatment Planning Systems

Healthcare Information Systems (ADAC Laboratories, Milpitas and HCIS a subsidiary of ADAC Laboratories ) 

ADAC Laboratories were once the US domestic market leaders and as of 2021 are still in clinical use around the world and are also used for commercial & educational use

Corporate Affairs

Company Acquisitions 

 1993 SD&G Healthcare Systems, Inc., specializing in radiology information systems.
 1995 Community Health Computing (CHC), Inc.,  specializing in laboratory and radiology information systems
 1997 Cortet, Inc., a developer of integrated computer systems for use in cardiac catheterization laboratories

Patent Acquisitions 

 ADAC purchases Philips' nuclear medicine patent portfolio, consisting of 13 U.S. patents and 56 foreign patents and patent applications. (1994)

Litigation 

 Elscint sues ADAC for patent infringement, ADAC counter sues. (1993)

Corporate Officers 

 Lowe, David L (CEO/Director)
 Eckert, R Andrew (CEO/Director)
 Starr, Robert A (Director)
 Simone Phillip A (Treasurer)
 Czerwinski, Stanley D (CEO/Director)
King, Graham O.  (Director)
 Masterson, Karen L (Corporate Secretary)

Related Entities with reference to 540 Alder Drive, Milpitas 

 Adac Medical Technologies, Inc
 Adac Laboratories
 Adac Research & Manufacturing, Inc
 Adac/SD&G Healthcare Systems, Inc
 Adac Radiology Services, Inc
 Adac Healthcare Partners, Inc

ADAC International Subsidiaries 

 ADAC Laboratories (Australia)
ADAC Laboartories (Brazil)
ADAC Laboratories (Canada)
 ADAC Laboratories (Denmark) (Jellingvej  5 9230 Svenstrup, Denmark,  DK)
 ADAC Laboratories (France)
 ADAC Laboratories (Germany)
 ADAC Laboratories (Italy)
ADAC Laboratoires (Japan)
ADAC Laboratories (Latin America)
ADAC Laboratories (Netherlands) (European H.Q.)
ADAC Laboratories (Pacific)
 ADAC Laboratories (United Kingdom) Thame, Oxfordshire.

References

Technology companies established in 1970
Philips
Companies based in Silicon Valley
Defunct technology companies based in California
Technology companies disestablished in 2000
2000 mergers and acquisitions
1970 establishments in California
2000 disestablishments in California